The Park Chennai is a five-star deluxe hotel located at the Anna Flyover junction on the erstwhile Gemini Studios premises on Anna Salai, Chennai, India. The hotel, part of the Apeejay Surrendra Group, was opened on 15 May 2002 at an investment of around  1 billion.

History
The place where The Park hotel stands today was the location of the Gemini Studios, a historic film studio since the 1940s. Gemini Studios, established on Mount Road as "Movieland" by filmmaker K. Subrahmanyam, was the city's biggest studio. In 1940, the studio was destroyed by a fire. S. S. Vasan, a Tamil film maker and a friend of K. Subramaniam, bought the Motion Picture Producers' Combines studio in 1940 in a court auction for  86,427-11-9, the odd figure arrived at through including the interest on unpaid wages of the employees. The studio was rebuilt and opened under the name Gemini Studios in 1941, which went on to become one of the finest studio and a legendary film production centre in the Subcontinent. Gemini Pictures declined in the 1970s though remaining successful as a studio and equipment rental business. In the 1990s, two buildings were built in the corner of the studio's premises only to be considered unfavourable among buyers. By the turn of the 21st century, the Kolkata-based Park Group of Hotels bought the three-star property in the premises and turned it into a five-star luxury hotel and opened it on 15 May 2002 at a cost of  1,100 million. In the same year, the other block was scheduled for auction by Indian Bank with a reserve price of  930 million.

In 2010, the hotel had a legal fight with the Corporation of Chennai over the ownership of an open space reservation (OSR) land on which the hotel's perimeter compound wall with fountains was built.

The hotel
The art-concept boutique hotel has 214 rooms, including 120 Deluxe rooms, 79 Luxury rooms, 6 Studio suites, 5 Deluxe suites, 3 Premier suites and 1 Presidential suite. Dining facilities in the hotel include a Thai restaurant named Lotus, 601 (Six-O-One) All day dining restaurant, Pasha–Night club and the Aqua & A2 Restaurants situated on the eighth floor. The hotel also has a bar named the Leather Bar as a tribute to the city's leather industry. The hotel also has a shopping arcade.

Awards
In 2006, Forbes listed "Atrium" in The Park hotel, Chennai, with its menu designed by Italian chef Antonio Carluccio, amongst India's top 10 most expensive restaurants.

See also

 Hotels in Chennai
 List of tallest buildings in Chennai

References

External links
 Official website

Hotels in Chennai
Hotels established in 2002
2002 establishments in Tamil Nadu
Skyscraper hotels in Chennai